Avec Amour is the 1981 third album of French singer Anna Prucnal.

Track listing
 Histoire d'amour
 Cède le passage
 La Complainte du partisan
 À la belle saison
 L'Exilée (theme for Costa-Gavras film version of the novel Clair de femme)
 Trois œillets rouges
 Che
 Tes Amours de quarantaine
 La Voleuse
 Fuite

References

1981 albums